Jacques Duclos (2 October 189625 April 1975) was a French Communist politician who played a key role in French politics from 1926, when he entered the French National Assembly after defeating Paul Reynaud, until 1969, when he won a substantial portion of the vote in the presidential elections.

Biography
Born in Louey, Hautes-Pyrénées, Duclos fought in the Battle of Verdun, where he was wounded. He was captured at Chemin des Dames, and remained a prisoner of war for the remainder of the war. In 1920, he joined the newly formed French Communist Party. He rose to the Central Committee in 1926, and defeated Léon Blum in the elections for deputy in the 20th arrondissement. He was named head of the propaganda section of the Party in 1936, and was elected to Vice-President of the French National Assembly.

A Stalinist, Duclos was for more than 35 years the brain behind political choices made by Maurice Thorez and Benoît Frachon. He was involved in the International Communist Movement, in the Comintern, and in the Cominform. In the 1930s, he was assigned the task of exerting "discipline" on Communist Movements in Spain (1930, 1935) and Belgium (1934–1935). On Joseph Stalin's orders, he advised the Communist Party of Spain to participate in the Popular Front at the outbreak of the Spanish Civil War.

Upon France's defeat in 1940, Duclos, the most senior PCF official in France, engaged in negotiations with the Nazi authorities with a view to legalising the Communist Party (banned following the signature of the Molotov-Ribbentrop Pact and the declaration of war) as well as requesting permission to restart publication of the PCF daily (L'Humanité) (banned by the French government for the same reasons). The negotiations did not succeed but hurt the PCF's post-war credibility among the populace.

Duclos was the supervisor of the clandestine party throughout the Nazi German Occupation (1940–44), and, with Pierre Villon, took the initiative in creating the Front National resistance movement, which was the political front for the Francs-Tireurs et Partisans (FTP) guerrillas.

The Communist Party USA, meanwhile, had been following a Popular Front line under Earl Browder supportive of the New Deal. In fact, Browder had gone so far as to dissolve the Communist Party, and replace it with a "Communist Political Association" which would work within the existing two-party system to advance Marxist goals. With the end of the Great Power alliance at the end of World War II and the beginning of the Cold War, "Browderism" came under attack from the rest of the international Communist movement. In 1945 Duclos, as a prominent leader of the French Communist Party, published an article supposedly written by him denouncing Browder's policy (it had actually been written in Moscow, and published secretly there in early 1945, in a magazine restricted to high Soviet Communist officials; the published article was a French translation of the Russian original). With the Comintern having been dissolved during the war, the "Duclos letter" was used to communicate informally Moscow's views.

CPUSA official Gil Green told interviewer Anders Stephanson:

William Z. Foster, Browder's predecessor and a staunch Marxist-Leninist, led the opposition to Browder within the CPUSA and replaced him as party chairman in 1945, with Eugene Dennis taking over as General Secretary. Browder was expelled from the party in 1946.

After 1950, Thorez's health faltered, but Duclos remained one of the most influential members of the Party. He was acting Secretary General from 1950 to 1953 in Thorez's absence and was instrumental in eliminating his rival André Marty from the Party's leadership. Waldeck Rochet's own failing health prompted Duclos to run as the Party's presidential candidate in the 1969 election, scoring 21.27% of the vote, the highest ever for a communist presidential candidate in France. He died in Montreuil on 25 April 1975 at age 78.

References

External links 

  Reprinted in William Z. Foster et al. Marxism-Leninism vs. Revisionism. New York: New Century Publishers, February 1946, pp. 21–35.

1896 births
1975 deaths
People from Hautes-Pyrénées
Politicians from Occitania (administrative region)
French Communist Party politicians
Members of the 13th Chamber of Deputies of the French Third Republic
Members of the 14th Chamber of Deputies of the French Third Republic
Members of the 16th Chamber of Deputies of the French Third Republic
Members of the Constituent Assembly of France (1945)
Members of the Constituent Assembly of France (1946)
Deputies of the 1st National Assembly of the French Fourth Republic
Deputies of the 2nd National Assembly of the French Fourth Republic
Deputies of the 3rd National Assembly of the French Fourth Republic
French Senators of the Fifth Republic
Senators of Seine (department)
Senators of Seine-Saint-Denis
Candidates for President of France
Comintern people
French military personnel of World War I
French prisoners of war in World War I
Communist members of the French Resistance
World War I prisoners of war held by Germany
French people of the Spanish Civil War
French Resistance members
Red Orchestra (espionage)
Members of the Front National (French Resistance) movement
Burials at Père Lachaise Cemetery